Brett Miller is a Republican member of the Pennsylvania House of Representatives.

Background
He was born in the Poconos region and moved to Lancaster County to start his career as a guidance counselor. He spent more than 20 years at Warwick Middle School where he was also a coach for track and field. Miller earned degrees from Liberty University and certifications from Penn State and Millersville.

Miller served three terms as township supervisor in East Hempfield Township.

2014 election
Rep. Ryan Aument announced he would not seek reelection as he made a bid for the 36th district State Senate seat. Miller successfully sought the Republican nomination for the 41st House district and defeated Democratic challenger Alice Yoder in the Lancaster suburban and Republican-leaning district.

Committee assignments 

 Aging & Older Adult Services
 Consumer Affairs
 Local Government
 State Government, Subcommittee on Public Pensions, Benefits and Risk Management - Chair

References

External links
Official Web Site
PA House profile

Republican Party members of the Pennsylvania House of Representatives
Liberty University alumni
Living people
Politicians from Lancaster, Pennsylvania
21st-century American politicians
1961 births